Heliothis galatheae is a species of moth of the family Noctuidae first described by Hans Daniel Johan Wallengren in 1856. It is found all over Africa, including South Africa to Ethiopia and the Gambia.

External links
 
 

Heliothis
Moths described in 1856
Moths of Africa
Moths of the Middle East